The red deer (Cervus elaphus) is a large mammal endemic to Europe, Western Asia and North Africa.

Red Deer may also refer to:

Animals 
Central Asian red deer, now oft considered a distinct species

Places in Canada 
 Red Deer, Alberta, a city
 Red Deer (electoral district), a federal constituency
 Red Deer (provincial electoral district), defunct constituency
 Red Deer County, a larger municipal district
 Red Deer Polytechnic, a college
 Red Deer River, in Alberta and Saskatchewan (from which the city is named)
 Red Deer River (Manitoba), in Manitoba and Saskatchewan
 Red Deer Hill, Saskatchewan

Other uses
 HMCS Red Deer, a minesweeper in the Royal Canadian Navy
 Red Deer Rebels, an ice hockey team in Red Deer, Alberta, Canada
 Red Deer (film), a Canadian drama film

See also 
 Red Deer Lake (disambiguation), several lakes
 Red Deer Cave people, early hominids